Aethes rana is a species of moth of the family Tortricidae. It was described by August Busck in 1907. It is found in the United States, where it has been recorded from Illinois, Indiana, Kentucky, Maryland, Ohio and Pennsylvania.

Adults are on wing from July to September. The forewings are whitish ocherous, strongly suffused with dark fuscous and with blackish-brown markings. The hindwings are ocherous fuscous.

References

rana
Moths described in 1907
Moths of North America